The Church of St Martin is the main church in the Freguesia (Parish in English) of São Martinho (Funchal), Madeira. Dedicated to St. Martin of Tours.

History 

The old church at the bottom of the hill had become too small for the area and so construction started on July 8, 1883 on the current church of the same name, with the first stone being laid. Lack of founds halted construction until August 2, 1907, when the local  parishioner José de Abreu died leaving almost all of his fortune, which for the time was large, to the continuation of the works of the same church.

Festival 

The main festival that is celebrated is St Martin's day (Festa de São Martinho or Arraial de São Martinho in Portuguese) celebrated on the 10 and 11 November in the grounds of the church, where fires are made by locals and local food is made such as roasted chestnuts (Marking the beginning of the new chestnut harvest season), Espetada, Bolo do caco, and Bacalhau. The grapes that were harvested a few months before and made into wine, are first tasted on this day.

References

External links 

Catholic Church in Madeira
Roman Catholic churches completed in 1918
Churches in Madeira
20th-century Roman Catholic church buildings in Portugal